Llandudno Urban District, also known as Llandudno cum Eglwys Rhos UD in Caernarfonshire 1894-1974, and was replaced by the District of Aberconwy.

Further information and details of the archives are here.

Information on Llandudno Urban District Council Transport is here.

Urban districts of Wales
Caernarfonshire
Llandudno